Del Campo Peak is a prominent summit near the western edge of the North Cascades, in Snohomish County of Washington state. It is located south of Barlow Pass along the Mountain Loop Highway near the Monte Cristo area. It is situated on land administered by the Mount Baker-Snoqualmie National Forest. The mountain is named for a mining claim on the mountain's slope. The nearest peak is Gothic Peak,  to the southwest, and Foggy Pass is the low point between the two peaks. Foggy Lake lies in Gothic Basin below the south face of Del Campo Peak and collects precipitation runoff which ultimately drains to South Fork Sauk River via Weden Creek. Runoff from the west side of the mountain drains into the Sultan River, and the north side drains into headwaters of the Stillaguamish River. In terms of favorable weather, the best months for climbing are July through September.

History

The mountain's name was submitted in 1917 by Dr. Harry B. Hinman, Chairman of The Everett Mountaineers. The name was officially adopted in 1918 by the U.S. Board on Geographic Names. The first ascent of the peak was made in 1912 by J.A. Juleen.

Climate

Del Campo Peak is located in the marine west coast climate zone of western North America. Most weather fronts originate in the Pacific Ocean, and travel northeast toward the Cascade Mountains. As fronts approach the North Cascades, they are forced upward by the peaks of the Cascade Range, causing them to drop their moisture in the form of rain or snowfall onto the Cascades (Orographic lift). As a result, the west side of the North Cascades experiences high precipitation, especially during the winter months in the form of snowfall. Because of maritime influence, snow tends to be wet and heavy, resulting in high avalanche danger. Due to its temperate climate and proximity to the Pacific Ocean, areas west of the Cascade Crest very rarely experience temperatures below  or above . During winter months, weather is usually cloudy, but, due to high pressure systems over the Pacific Ocean that intensify during summer months, there is often little or no cloud cover during the summer. The months July through September offer the most favorable weather for viewing or climbing this peak.

Geology
The North Cascades features some of the most rugged topography in the Cascade Range with craggy peaks, ridges, and deep glacial valleys. Geological events occurring many years ago created the diverse topography and drastic elevation changes over the Cascade Range leading to various climate differences. These climate differences lead to vegetation variety defining the ecoregions in this area.

The history of the formation of the Cascade Mountains dates back millions of years ago to the late Eocene Epoch. With the North American Plate overriding the Pacific Plate, episodes of volcanic igneous activity persisted. In addition, small fragments of the oceanic and continental lithosphere called terranes created the North Cascades about 50 million years ago.

During the Pleistocene period dating back over two million years ago, glaciation advancing and retreating repeatedly scoured the landscape leaving deposits of rock debris. The U-shaped cross section of the river valleys are a result of recent glaciation. Uplift and faulting in combination with glaciation have been the dominant processes which have created the tall peaks and deep valleys of the North Cascades area.

References

External links

 Del Campo Peak weather: Mountain Forecast
 Del Campo Peak: PBase aerial photo

Cascade Range
Mountains of Washington (state)
Mountains of Snohomish County, Washington
Mount Baker-Snoqualmie National Forest
North American 2000 m summits